Oceanside Unified School District is a public school district serving the city of Oceanside in San Diego County, California, United States. The district's vision is that "all students graduate college and career ready, prepared to be responsible global citizens and ambitious future leaders."

There are 23 schools in the district, including 16 K-5 schools, 4 middle schools, 2 comprehensive high schools, and 1 alternative high school. These include Oceanside High School and El Camino High School.

Since 2014, Dr. Duane Coleman has been the Superintendent of Schools. Dr. Coleman founded the Oceanside Promise, a cross-sector community organization dedicated to preparing students for college, career, and life from birth.

Demographics 
Of the 18,899 students, the majority of the students attending the district are Hispanic (58.02%), and the demographic makeup of the District is 24.17% White, 5.47% African American, and 12.34% Other. Approximately 18% of the students are English Language Learners. Approximately 57% of the students in the district qualify for free and reduced lunch.

Notable alumni 
 Barbara Mandrell, country singer, former Miss Oceanside. Graduated from Oceanside High School in 1967.
 Denise Richards, actress who starred in Starship Troopers, Wild Things and the James Bond film The World Is Not Enough. Graduated from El Camino High School in 1989. 
 Victor Villaseñor, acclaimed Mexican-American writer.
 Chris Chambliss, Major League Baseball Player. Graduated from Oceanside High School.
 Gary Thomasson, Major League Baseball Player. Graduated from Oceanside High School.
 Junior Seau, National Football League player. Graduated from Oceanside High School.
 Sam Brenner, National Football League Player. Graduated from Oceanside High School.
 Michael Booker, National Football League Player. Graduated from El Camino High School.
 Willie James Buchanon, National Football League Player. Graduated from Oceanside High School in 1968.
 Joe Salave'a, National Football League Player. Graduated from Oceanside High School.
 Toussaint Tyler, National Football League Player. Graduated from El Camino High School.
 Bryant Westbrook, National Football League Player. Graduated from El Camino High School in 1993.
 Dokie Williams, National Football League Player. Graduated from El Camino High School.

References

External links 
 

School districts in San Diego County, California